Spain took part in the Eurovision Song Contest 1965. The country was represented by Conchita Bautista with the song "¡Qué bueno, qué bueno!". Conchita Bautista had already represented Spain in 1961. The song was chosen through the national final Eurofestival.

Before Eurovision

Eurofestival
The national final took place at TVE's studios in Barcelona on 7 February 1965, hosted by José Luis Barcelona and Irene Mur. In the four previous months, 54 candidate songs were presented to the audience in the weekly TV show Gran Parada. At the end of each month a semi-final was held with the top two songs going through the final. TVE then added six other songs to the seven qualifiers (one was eliminated). The jury in the final consisted of 16 members, a mixture of experts and TV viewers. Each juror awarded a point to all songs except one; the song with the fewest points was eliminated. This process was repeated until the winning song was left.

At Eurovision
Conchita Bautista was the third to perform in the running order, following the United Kingdom and preceding Ireland. She received nul point for her performance, sharing the last place with Germany, Belgium and Finland.

Voting 
Spain did not receive any points at the 1965 Eurovision Song Contest.

References

1965
Countries in the Eurovision Song Contest 1965
Eurovision